The 2011–12 season was Arsenal's 20th season in the Premier League, and also marked the club's 125th anniversary. In the Premier League, Arsenal struggled to recover from a poor start to the season. Though they did finish the season in the final qualification berth for the next season's UEFA Champions League. Arsenal's UEFA Champions League campaign once again proved unsuccessful, falling at the first hurdle in the knockout stage, with a 4–0 defeat at Milan ultimately proving fatal. Exiting the FA Cup at the fifth round stage at the hands of Sunderland, and the League Cup in the quarter-finals against Manchester City, the two domestic cups were also out of Arsenal's reach.

Arsenal finished the season in third place after winning their last league match 3–2 against West Bromwich Albion on 13 May 2012. It was the first season since the invincibles in 2003–04 which Arsenal finished the top London club in the league, or in which Arsenal finished ahead of Chelsea.

Review

Pre-season

Arsenal's pre-season transfer activity was once again dominated by media speculation regarding the future of club captain Cesc Fàbregas, whose return to boyhood club Barcelona was widely expected, although not officially confirmed until the middle of August when an initial fee in the region of £30 million was agreed between the two clubs. Prior to this, the Gunners' first signing came in the form of young English-Finnish right-back Carl Jenkinson from Charlton Athletic on 8 June for an initial fee of around £1 million, while the first major signing did not come until 11 July with the signing of Gervinho from French champions Lille for more than £10 million. The only notable exits in July came in goalkeeper Jens Lehmann, who retired for the second time, having come out of his first retirement in March to solve an injury crisis that left Arsenal with just one match-fit goalkeeper, while Gaël Clichy joined Manchester City. It was August before the club's transfer activity increased, with promising young striker Alex Oxlade-Chamberlain joining from Southampton for a reported £12 million, before the departures of Fàbregas to Barcelona, the long-serving Emmanuel Eboué to Turkish side Galatasaray, and Samir Nasri to Manchester City for a fee of £25 million. Left-back Armand Traoré's departure to newly promoted Queens Park Rangers on the penultimate day of the transfer window completed the departures from the first team, before Arsène Wenger, under increasing criticism for the lack of arrivals so far, went on something of a spending spree in the final 48 hours of the window. South Korea captain Park Chu-young joined from Monaco, before left-back André Santos, centre back Per Mertesacker and midfielder Mikel Arteta all joined in the dying hours of the window, from Fenerbahçe, Werder Bremen and Everton respectively. Yossi Benayoun also joined the club on a season long loan from Chelsea, whilst striker Nicklas Bendtner was loaned to Sunderland for the same period, following fellow first-team members Denílson and Carlos Vela, who had joined São Paulo and Real Sociedad on loan earlier in the window. At the close of the window, Arsenal had spent an estimated £51.2 million, compared to an income of nearly £75 million.

Away from the transfer window, Robin van Persie was chosen to replace the departing Fàbregas as club captain, having stood in on several previous occasions when Fàbregas was not playing. Pre-season saw Arsenal hold their first ever Asian tour, commencing against a Malaysian League XI in Kuala Lumpur where goals from Aaron Ramsey, Theo Walcott, Carlos Vela and Tomáš Rosický earned the Gunners a 4–0 win. Chinese side Hangzhou Greentown proved a tougher test in Arsenal's next match, where after falling behind in the 16th minute, Vela scored to achieve a 1–1 draw. Arsenal travelled next to Germany to face 1. FC Köln where new signing Gervinho scored twice in eight minutes on his debut to put the side two goals ahead, before fellow newcomer Carl Jenkinson put the ball through Arsenal's own net, to result in a 2–1 victory for the Gunners. Arsenal's only home pre-season matches came in the annual Emirates Cup tournament, where Boca Juniors, the New York Red Bulls and Paris Saint-Germain were welcomed to London. Arsenal's matches both ended in draws, first surrendering a Van Persie and Aaron Ramsey created two-goal lead against Boca Juniors, before conceding an 84th-minute own goal from Kyle Bartley against the New York Red Bulls the next day, cancelling out a Van Persie opener. Arsenal's run of pre-season fixtures concluded with a loss to Portuguese team Benfica in the Eusébio Cup, once again surrendering a one-goal advantage courtesy of Van Persie to end up losing 2–1 in Lisbon.

August
Arsenal's fixtures in the Premier League started at Newcastle United, where, despite surrendering a four-goal lead last season, they played out a 0–0 draw this time around. In the match, Gervinho receiving a straight red-card on his competitive debut, whilst Alex Song received a retrospective charge of violent conduct for stamping on Joey Barton. The Gunners faced a two-legged tie against Italian side Udinese to secure qualification to the season's UEFA Champions League competition, with Theo Walcott's fourth-minute goal separating the teams in the first leg at the Emirates, before goals from Walcott and Robin van Persie, as well as a penalty save from Wojciech Szczęsny, saw the Gunners secure victory in the away leg in Udine, and secure their place in the group stage of the competition.

The two legs were sandwiched between an early Premier League title contender clash at the Emirates against Liverpool, where an own goal from Aaron Ramsey and a last minute strike from new Liverpool signing Luis Suárez saw the team fall to a 0–2 defeat, and fuel the widely held belief that Arsenal would once again fail to prove serious challengers for the league title. Any attempt to dispel such a notion was dealt a huge blow the following week, when Arsenal travelled to Old Trafford to suffer their heaviest ever defeat in the Premier League. A hat-trick from Wayne Rooney, two goals from Ashley Young and goals from Danny Welbeck, Nani and Park Ji-sung saw the club slump to an 8–2 hammering at the hands of Manchester United, with Walcott and Van Persie's goals proving no consolation as Arsenal ended the month hovering just one place above the relegation zone, having failed to win any of their opening three league matches.

September
Arsenal eventually secured their first league win of the season at home to newly promoted Swansea City at the start of September, when Andrey Arshavin's goal proved enough to separate the sides, before the team faced the first of their six Champions League group stage fixtures away to German champions Borussia Dortmund. A win looked to be on the cards thanks to Robin van Persie's first half goal, but Dortmund's Ivan Perišić equalised with just two minutes left to play leaving Arsenal to be satisfied with just a single point. Any hope of progress in the Premier League was dashed when the Gunners gave away a 2–1 half-time lead away to Blackburn Rovers, with own goals from both Alex Song and Laurent Koscielny gifting Blackburn a 4–3 victory.

Arsenal's opening match in the League Cup looked to be a straightforward home tie against League Two outfit Shrewsbury Town, but it was the opposition that opened the scoring, before Kieran Gibbs, Alex Oxlade-Chamberlain and Yossi Benayoun eventually secured progress to the fourth round. This seemed to spark some life into the team, and they ran out 3–0 winners the following week against Bolton Wanderers in the league thanks to a brace from Robin van Persie and a late goal from Alex Song, before securing their first group stage win in Europe at home to Greek champions Olympiacos with goals from Oxlade-Chamberlain and André Santos.

October
Any suggestion that the end of September had been the start of an Arsenal turnaround was proved wrong in the North London derby at the start of October. Rafael van der Vaart's opening goal at White Hart Lane was cancelled out by Aaron Ramsey, before Kyle Walker secured the bragging rights for Tottenham Hotspur. Following an international break, the Gunners' home match against Sunderland looked set to be heading for a 1–1 draw until Van Persie scored in the last ten minutes to secure all three points, whilst a late goal also earned an away European victory against Marseille, with Ramsey providing the required firepower.

Arsenal's season continued to improve with a 3–1 league victory against Stoke City thanks to two goals from Van Persie and a strike from Gervinho, before Arshavin and Park Chu-young saw the team past Bolton Wanderers in the fourth round of the League Cup. The turnaround was complete when Arsenal beat title-rivals Chelsea 5–3 at Stamford Bridge thanks to goals from André Santos and Theo Walcott, as well as a hat-trick from Van Persie, a performance that helped the Dutchman to the Premier League player of the month award, and saw the Gunners finish October, seventh in the table.

November
November opened with Marseille visiting the Emirates for the return leg of the Champions League fixture, a game that ended in a 0–0 draw. In the Premier League, Arsenal's good form continued with a 3–0 victory over West Bromwich Albion thanks to goals from Van Persie, Mikel Arteta and Thomas Vermaelen, whose return from injury provided further good news for the team. After another international break, Arsenal continued where they left off with a 2–1 win at Norwich City thanks to two more goals from Robin van Persie, making him just the third player since the Premier League's inception after Alan Shearer and former Arsenal captain Thierry Henry to score 30 goals in a calendar year.

With their Premier League campaign seemingly re-energised, Arsenal's attention turned once more to the Champions League, with Borussia Dortmund being the latest visitors to the Emirates. Arsenal knew a win would be sufficient to secure progression to the knockout phase, but it was Dortmund who made the brighter start until injuries forced two of their key players – Sven Bender and Mario Götze, to be substituted before half time. This allowed Arsenal to capitalise, with man of the moment Van Persie netting two goals in the second half thanks to assists first from Alex Song and then Thomas Vermaelen, before Shinji Kagawa netted the Germans a consolation goal in injury time. The 2–1 victory was not only enough to secure the Gunners' progression, but also top spot in Group F thanks to Olympiacos' victory over second-placed Marseille in the night's other match.

This Champions League success came at a price, however, with the team appearing off form in their next Premier League game against Fulham, who took the lead in the match thanks to a Thomas Vermaelen own goal. It was only when the Belgian defender was able to convert into the right net in the 82nd minute that the Gunners were able to draw level, and end the match with a 1–1 draw. The impact of the result was only alleviated by results elsewhere, with four of the six teams above Arsenal in the table – Liverpool, Manchester City, Manchester United and Newcastle United all playing out draws in the same weekend.

November ended on somewhat of a negative note, with the team exiting the League Cup with a fifth round loss to Manchester City, although the Gunners were by no means overwhelmed by the Premier League leaders. Instead, the young and relatively inexperienced side that included the likes of Emmanuel Frimpong, Alex Oxlade-Chamberlain and Park Chu-young, as well as reserve team players Ignasi Miquel and Francis Coquelin, held their own for much of the match, with just a single goal by Sergio Agüero in the 83rd minute being able to separate the two sides.

December
A 4–0 win in the Premier League away at Wigan Athletic allowed Arsenal to continue their progression up the league table thanks to goals from Mikel Arteta, Thomas Vermaelen, Gervinho and Robin van Persie, before the team travelled to Athens to face Olympiacos in their final group stage match in the Champions League. With a group topping position already secured, Arsène Wenger chose to field a much weakened side, making ten changes from the team that started at Wigan three days earlier, and this was evident as the team fell to a 3–1 defeat. Łukasz Fabiański was injured in the 25th minute and replaced by Vito Mannone.

The return of Arsenal's stronger starting 11 in their next Premier League match saw the team return to winning ways, securing a 1–0 victory at home to Everton, before making the trip to the Etihad Stadium a week later to face league leaders Manchester City without both first choice full-backs, Bacary Sagna and André Santos. Despite these absences, the Gunners put up a strong fight, and it was only David Silva's effort early in the second half that was enough to separate the teams at the final whistle. Arsenal entered the Christmas fixtures with a 2–1 victory over Aston Villa, with Van Persie scoring his 34th Premier League goal of 2011, equaling Thierry Henry's club record, before Yossi Benayoun secured his first league goal for Arsenal, along with all three points.

Arsenal ended December with two games in four days, and Gervinho's eighth-minute goal looked to have set the Gunners off well against Wolverhampton Wanderers, but Steven Fletcher's equaliser later in the first half ended up restricting them to just a single point. The year ended with a 1–0 win over Queens Park Rangers at the Emirates, with Van Persie's goal being enough to secure him the club record for goals scored in a calendar year, although he did fall a single strike short of equalling Alan Shearer's Premier League record of 36.

January
Arsenal's new year seemed set to get off to a good start, with Laurent Koscielny's goal grabbing a lead against Fulham in their opening match, but in what has become something of an Arsenal trait, the team could not strengthen their position, and Fulham seized on this. Late goals from Steve Sidwell and Bobby Zamora undid Arsenal and saw the team fall to a 2–1 defeat. The defeat was, however, somewhat overshadowed by the club's announcement a few days later that the Gunners' record goal-scorer and former Captain Thierry Henry was returning to the Emirates for a short-term loan during the close-season of the North America's Major League Soccer (MLS), in which Henry now plays full-time.

Henry's second debut for the club came as a substitute in the team's first foray in this season's FA Cup, against Leeds United in the Third Round. Given Henry's record of 226 goals in his 370 appearances during his first stint at Arsenal, it came as little surprise when he netted the game's only goal just ten minutes after coming onto the pitch, securing the team's progress to the Fourth Round.

However, if things were going well in the Cup, the same could not be said for progress in the Premier League. Arsenal first surrendered an early lead against Swansea, before giving away another goal just seconds after grabbing an equaliser in the second half to go down 3–2 in South Wales. The following week, the Gunners hosted Manchester United for the first time since last year's 8–2 humiliation at Old Trafford. Despite United leading at half-time, Van Persie scored his 19th league goal of the season to draw the teams level, before Danny Welbeck took advantage of further defensive lapses to inflict the Arsenal's third defeat in a row, and further hamper the team's quest for qualification to next season's Champions League.

With the Premier League title now out of reach, Arsenal hosted Aston Villa in the Fourth Round of the FA Cup knowing that it was their last realistic chance of silverware. This chance did little to spur the team on, and goals from Richard Dunne and Darren Bent in the first half saw the Gunners' facing exit from the competition at half time. However, a spirited Arsenal performance in the opening spell of the second half, including three goals in seven minutes from Van Persie (2) and Theo Walcott, saw the team claim a 3–2 victory and secure a place in the Fifth Round.

February
Arsenal opened February with an emphatic 7–1 victory over struggling Blackburn to halt their poor run of league form. Van Persie brought his goal tally in all competitions to 28 with a hat-trick, whilst Alex Oxlade-Chamberlain continued his impressive run of form by scoring his first and second Premier League goals. Mikel Arteta also found the net, before Henry scored his first Premier League goal in nearly six years to complete the victory in stoppage time. Henry's talents were required again in Arsenal's next league match, away to Sunderland, who were on a superb run of form under new manager Martin O’Neill. Henry secured all three points for the Gunners in injury time, following Aaron Ramsey's earlier goal that cancelled out James McClean's goal for Sunderland.

Despite an apparent resurgence in the Premier League, Arsenal's cup ambitions took consecutive knocks in mid-February. They first lost the opening leg of their Champions League round of 16 match against Milan 4–0, before being knocked out of the FA Cup by Sunderland just three days later, leaving the team facing yet another season without any silverware.

These cup exits left Arsenal to focus solely on achieving fourth position in the league, and thus ensuring further Champions League football at the Emirates. This aim would be tested heavily in their next game, the North London derby against age-old rivals Tottenham, who have spent the season so far above Arsenal in the table. It seemed that Arsenal's poor form against their rivals in recent years was likely to continue, falling 2–0 behind through goals from Louis Saha and former Gunner Emmanuel Adebayor, before Bacary Sagna and the ever-reliable Van Persie scored in quick succession to bring the teams level at half-time. Arsenal continued to press in the second-half, and were rewarded with a goal from Tomáš Rosický and a brace from Theo Walcott to secure a memorable 5–2 victory that the Gunners would savour, and that saw the team strengthen their challenge for fourth place.

March
The North London derby victory spurred Arsenal on to continue their good Premier League form at the start of March. A Robin van Persie brace was enough to come from behind to beat Liverpool at Anfield, before securing a 3–0 home victory against Milan thanks to goals from Laurent Koscielny, Tomáš Rosický and Van Persie. Although not enough to overturn the first leg deficit, the win did allow the Gunners to bow out of European football for the season in excellent style.

Arsenal's reduced fixture-load soon became evident in results in the Premier League. They first secured an injury time victory against fellow competitors for the European places in the table, Newcastle. Vermaelen scored the winner in the fifth minute of added time at the end of the match, after Van Persie had drawn the teams level early in the first half. It was Vermaelen who again secured all three points in Arsenal's next match, away to Everton, a victory that was also enough to propel Arsenal above Tottenham into third place in the league table.

A 3–0 victory against Aston Villa, with goals from Kieran Gibbs, Theo Walcott and Mikel Arteta, took Arsenal's run of form to seven consecutive Premier League victories, a feat the team had not managed since October 2007, as well as strengthening their position in third place. The team, however, fell one game short of going the whole of March unbeaten, falling to a 2–1 defeat away to QPR, where Walcott's strike proved insufficient to secure any points for the Gunners.

April
April started well for Arsenal, with back to back victories helping them to maintain their position in the Premier League's Champions League qualifications places. A Mikel Arteta goal in the 87th minute was enough to first secure a 1–0 home victory over championship contenders Manchester City, before Van Persie, Walcott and Benayoun all scored to record a 3–0 victory at struggling Wolves.

Arsenal stuttered as April progressed however, falling first to a 2–1 home defeat by Wigan, where Thomas Vermaelen's goal was not enough to overcome two early Wigan goals, before the team played out a goalless draw with fellow European contenders Chelsea. Another draw completed Arsenal's April, sharing the points with Stoke after a 1–1 stalemate, with Van Persie adding another goal to his already impressive tally, pushing him closer to the Premier League's golden boot award, but also cancelling out Peter Crouch's earlier goal for the home side at the Britannia Stadium.

May
Arsenal's attempts to secure Champions League qualification continued into their final two matches of the season in May. Yossi Benayoun's opening goal just two minutes into their final home match of the season, against Norwich, seemed to have got them off to a good start, before two goals in twenty minutes gave the visitors an unexpected lead. A Van Persie brace in eight minutes put the Gunners back ahead, and seemingly on the verge of all but securing third place in the table. A Norwich equaliser in the 85th minute, however, shattered that dream, meaning their ongoing battle with Tottenham for guaranteed Champions League football would have to be settled on the final day of the season.

That final day saw Arsenal travel to face West Brom whilst Tottenham hosted Fulham, with an Arsenal win being enough to guarantee third. Tottenham took the lead in the second minute to take them above Arsenal in the table, but a second goal in as many games from Benayoun saw the Gunners retake the position just two minutes later. However, a brace from West Brom within four minutes saw Arsenal fall behind, and apparently gifting Spurs the last definite English berth in the Champions League, before André Santos was able to draw Arsenal back level before half-time. Arsenal were still outside the Premier League top three, and it fell to Laurent Koscielny to score in the 54th minute to secure victory and the final English group stage place in the next season's Champions League competition. As the season concluded, captain Robin van Persie was confirmed as the winner of the Premier League's Golden Boot award with 30 goals in the season.

Key events

9 June 2011: Finnish-English right back Carl Jenkinson moves to Arsenal from Charlton Athletic for an agreed fee of £1 million.
17 July: Thomas Cruise, Roarie Deacon and Mark Randall reach the end of their contracts with Arsenal to become free agents.
4 July 2011: French left back Gaël Clichy joins Manchester City for a fee of £7 million.
11 July 2011: Ivorian winger Gervinho joins Arsenal from Lille for a fee around £10.5 million.
26 July 2011: English striker Jay Emmanuel-Thomas signed for Championship club Ipswich Town for a fee of £1.1 million.
8 August 2011: English winger Alex Oxlade-Chamberlain signs from Southampton for an undisclosed fee, thought to be around £12 million.
9 August 2011: Japanese winger Ryo Miyaichi is granted a work permit which allows him to play for Arsenal.
15 August 2011: Spanish central midfielder Cesc Fàbregas joins Barcelona for a fee of £35 million, with a possible further £5 million of add-ons.
16 August 2011: Ivorian right back Emmanuel Eboué joins Galatasaray on a five-year deal for a fee of £4 million.
19 August 2011: Costa Rican striker Joel Campbell from Saprissa agreed terms with Arsenal; the fee is undisclosed, though thought to be around £1 million.
24 August 2011: French attacking midfielder Samir Nasri joins Manchester City on a four-year deal for around a deal of £25 million.
30 August 2011: Senegalese left back Armand Traoré joins Queens Park Rangers for £1.5 million, while South Korean striker Park Chu-young joins Arsenal from Monaco for £1.8 million.
31 August 2011: On the final day of the transfer window, Brazilian left back André Santos, German centre back Per Mertesacker, Israeli attacking midfielder Yossi Benayoun and Spanish central midfielder Mikel Arteta all join the club, while French striker Gilles Sunu leaves to join Lorient.
18 October 2011: Belgian centre back Thomas Vermaelen signs a new long-term contract.
10 December 2011: The club unveil bronze statues of Herbert Chapman, Tony Adams and Thierry Henry outside of Emirates Stadium as part of 125th Anniversary celebrations.
1 January 2012: Ghanaian midfielder Emmanuel Frimpong is loaned to Wolverhampton Wanderers for the remainder of the season.
6 January 2012: French forward Thierry Henry rejoins the club from New York Red Bulls on a two-month loan deal.
31 January 2012: German attacking midfielder Thomas Eisfeld joins the club on a long-term contract, while winger Ryo Miyaichi left on loan to Bolton Wanderers until the end of the season.
12 March 2012: Czech attacking midfielder Tomáš Rosický signs a new contract.

Players

Squad information

Reserve squad

Transfers

In

Total spending:  £51.57 million

Out

Total income:  £73.9 million

Loan in

Loan out

Overall transfer activity

Spending

 £51.57 million

Income

 £73.9 million

Net expenditure

 £22.33 million

Club

Coaching staff

Kit
Supplier: Nike / Sponsor: Fly Emirates

Kit information
Arsenal's home, away, third and goalkeeper outfits featured an anniversary crest to mark the club's 125th anniversary. The crest featured 15 laurel leaves on the left side of the crest to reflect the detail on the reverse of the sixpence pieces paid by 15 men to establish the Club in Woolwich in 1886. The 15 oak leaves to the right of the crest paid tribute to the founders who would meet in the local Royal Oak pub. Underneath the crest was one of the club's first recorded mottos – "Forward" – with the anniversary dates of 1886 and 2011 either side.

Home: The home kit was based on Nike Classic 2011 template in the club's traditional red and white colours, with red trim on the arms. 
Away: The away kit was based on Nike Harlequin 2011 template. The front of the away kit was divided into two-halves in navy blue and one turquoise, inspired by some of the away kits in the 1990s which featured the same colour scheme. The diagonal design represented the gnomon (the pointer) which casts the shadow on a sundial – to commemorate the original Dial Square sundial on the site of the Arsenal munitions factory in Woolwich, where the club was founded in 1886. The back of the shirt was entirely navy blue, with one sleeve navy and the other turquoise. A stripe runs down each sleeves, broken into three parts to further represent the Dial Square sundial. The away shorts were navy blue, as were the socks
Third: The yellow/maroon away kit from last season was retained as a third kit with 125th anniversary celebratory maroon badge, with yellow shorts used only once against Milan.
Keeper: The goalkeeper kits featured a stunning graphic running down from the bottom of the arms to the side of the shirt, which was part of Nike's 2011 goalkeeper template also worn by other clubs as well. The first-choice kit was mainly navy with orange detailing. The alternative kits were dark green with yellow detailing and grey with turquoise detailing, respectively.

Other information

Competitions

Overall

Pre-season

Friendlies

Emirates Cup

Eusébio Cup

Premier League

League table

Results summary

Results by round

Matches

UEFA Champions League

Play-off round

Group stage

Knockout phase

Round of 16

FA Cup

League Cup

Squad statistics

Appearances and goals

|}
[R] – Reserve team player
[L] – Out on loan
[S] – Sold

Top scorers

1Thierry Henry originally had 3 goals accredited to his name, but the seventh goal in Arsenal's 7–1 win over Blackburn Rovers was given as an own goal to Scott Dann. This takes his club figure down to 228 goals.

Disciplinary record

Captains

Awards

Premier League Manager of the Month award

Awarded monthly to the manager that was chosen by a panel assembled by the Premier League's sponsor

Premier League Player of the Month award

Awarded monthly to the player that was chosen by a panel assembled by the Premier League's sponsor

PFA Players' Player of the Year award

Awarded to the player who is adjudged to have been the best throughout the Premier League season, by the Professional Footballers' Association (PFA).

PFA Fans' Player of the Year award

Awarded to the player who is adjudged to have been the best throughout the Premier League season, by the Professional Footballers' Association's (PFA) fans.

PFA Team of the Year award

Awarded to the players who are adjudged to have been the best throughout the Premier League season, by the Professional Footballers' Association (PFA).

FWA Footballer of the Year award

Awarded to the player who is adjudged to have been the best throughout the Premier League season, by the Football Writers' Association (FWA).

Premier League Golden Boot award

Awarded to the player who has scored the most goals throughout the Premier League season.

20th Anniversary Barclay Premier League Awards

Best Squad in the Premier League award
Awarded to the squad who is adjudged to have been the best throughout the history of the Premier League, by a panel assembled by the Premier League's sponsor.

See also
 2011–12 in English football
 List of Arsenal F.C. seasons

References

External links
 Arsenal 2011–12 on statto.com

2011-12
2011–12 Premier League by team
2011–12 UEFA Champions League participants seasons